Bavilia is a genus of moths of the family Noctuidae.

Species
 Bavilia flavocostata Moschler, 1880

References
 Natural History Museum Lepidoptera genus database

Calpinae